Hilary Momberger-Powers (born Hilary Denise Momberger; June 16, 1962) is an American actress, former child voice actress, and script supervisor, who is best known for voicing Sally Brown in the Peanuts franchise in the late-1960s and early-1970s.

Career
Momberger was the voice of Sally Brown in five Peanuts specials It Was a Short Summer, Charlie Brown (1969), Play It Again, Charlie Brown (1971), You're Not Elected, Charlie Brown (1972), There's No Time for Love, Charlie Brown (1973), and A Charlie Brown Thanksgiving (1973). She also voiced Sally in the second Peanuts movie Snoopy, Come Home (1972). In recent years Momberger has become a successful script supervisor working on varied film titles including:Being John Malkovich and Rat Race . She also appeared in episodes of Dawson's Creek, Grey's Anatomy and Ally McBeal.

Filmography

Film

Television

References

External links
 

American child actresses
Living people
American voice actresses
1962 births
Actresses from Los Angeles
20th-century American actresses
Script supervisors
21st-century American women